The 14th Filmfare Awards were held in 1967, honoring the best Hindi films of 1966. 

Guide led the ceremony with 9 nominations, and won a leading 7 awards, thus becoming the most-awarded film at the ceremony. It also became the first film to win all 4 major Filmfare Awards – Best Film, Best Director (for Vijay Anand), Best Actor (for Dev Anand) and Best Actress (for Waheeda Rehman).

The ceremony also proved to be controversial, as S. D. Burman who was nominated for Best Music Director, and Lata Mangeshkar who was nominated for Best Playback Singer for "Aaj Phir Jeene Ki Tamanna Hai", both lost their respective awards to Shankar-Jaikishan and Mohammed Rafi (for "Baharon Phool Barsao"), both for Suraj, despite being highly-favored to win in their respective categories.

Shashikala received dual nominations for Best Supporting Actress for her performances in Anupama and Phool Aur Patthar, but lost to Simi Garewal who won the award for Do Badan.

Main awards

Best Film
 Guide 
Anupama
Mamta

Best Director
 Vijay Anand – Guide 
Asit Sen – Mamta
Hrishikesh Mukherjee – Anupama

Best Actor
 Dev Anand – Guide 
Dharmendra – Phool Aur Patthar
Dilip Kumar – Dil Diya Dard Liya

Best Actress
 Waheeda Rehman – Guide 
Meena Kumari – Phool Aur Patthar
Suchitra Sen – Mamta

Best Supporting Actor
 Ashok Kumar – Afsana  
Pran – Dil Diya Dard Liya
Rehman – Dil Ne Phir Yaad Kiya

Best Supporting Actress
 Simi Garewal – Do Badan 
Shashikala – Anupama
Shashikala – Phool Aur Patthar

Best Comic Actor
 Mehmood – Pyar Kiye Jaa 
Mehmood – Love in Tokyo
Om Prakash – Pyar Kiye Jaa

Best Story
 Guide – R. K. Narayan 
Anupama – Hrishikesh Mukherjee
Mamta – Nihar Ranjan Gupta

Best Dialogue
 Guide – Vijay Anand

Best Music Director 
 Suraj – Shankar–Jaikishan 
Do Badan – Ravi
Guide – S. D. Burman

Best Lyricist
 Suraj – Hasrat Jaipuri for Baharon Phool Barsao 
Do Badan – Shakeel Badayuni for Naseeb Main Jiske
Teesri Kasam – Shailendra for Sajan Re Jhoot

Best Playback Singer
 Suraj – Mohammed Rafi for Baharon Phool Barsao 
Do Badan – Lata Mangeshkar for Lo Aa Gayi
Guide –  Lata Mangeshkar for Aaj Phir Jeene Ki Tamanna Hai

Best Art Direction, B&W
 Yeh Raat Phir Na Aayegi

Best Art Direction, Color
 Phool Aur Patthar

Best Cinematography, B&W
 Anupama

Best Cinematography, Color
 Guide

Best Editing
 Phool Aur Patthar

Best Sound
 Mera Saaya

Critics' awards

Best Documentary
 Handicrafts of Rajasthan

Biggest Winners
 Guide – 7/9
 Suraj – 3/3
 Phool Aur Patthar – 2/5

See also
 16th Filmfare Awards
 15th Filmfare Awards
 Filmfare Awards

References
https://www.imdb.com/event/ev0000245/1967/

Filmfare Awards
Filmfare
1967 in Indian cinema